ISO/TC 184/SC 4 is an international standards organization responsible for industrial data. ISO/TC 184/SC 4 develops and maintains ISO standards that describe and manage industrial product data throughout the life of the product. ISO/TC 184/SC 4, Industrial data, is Subcommittee 4 of ISO/TC 184, Automation systems and integration, which is Technical Committee 184 of the International Organization for Standardization (ISO).

Example standards 
ISO/TC 184/SC 4 has direct responsibility for many standards and projects. Some examples:

 ISO 8000, Data quality
 ISO 10303, Industrial automation systems and integration — Product data representation and exchange, informally known as Standard for the Exchange of Product Model Data (STEP)
 ISO 13584, Industrial automation systems and integration — Parts library (PLIB)
 ISO 15926, Industrial automation systems and integration — Integration of life-cycle data for process plants including oil and gas production facilities
 ISO 18629, Industrial automation systems and integration — Process specification language (PSL)

References

External links 
 ISO website
 ISO website page on TC 184/SC 4
 United States Technical Advisory Group (US TAG) to ISO TC 184/SC 4
 Future meetings of ISO TC 184/SC 4

Product lifecycle management
184 SC 4